Attila Bartis (born 1968) is a Romanian-born Hungarian writer, photographer, dramatist and journalist. He received the Attila József Prize in 2005. His books have been translated into over 20 different languages. In 2001, he published his second novel, Tranquility, which was adapted into film in 2008. In 2017, he became a member of the Széchenyi Academy of Literature and Arts.

Early life and education
Attila Bartis was born in 1968 in Târgu Mureș, in the Transylvania region of Romania. Ferenc, his father, was a writer, poet and journalist. His family were part of the Hungarian minority of Romania. Following the Hungarian Revolution of 1956, Ferenc was imprisoned in Gherla Prison but was given amnesty by Nicolae Ceaușescu seven years later and released. Attila grew up drawing, painting, photographing and writing poems and short stories. His mother, who played the violin, died in the summer of 1983. In 1984, sixteen-year-old Attila and his father were stripped of their Romanian citizenship and presented with stateless passports, and advised to leave for Hungary. Attila moved with his father to Budapest. Attila graduated from a gymnasium in Pest. He worked as a photographer and in a used bookstore.

Career

Writing
In 1995, at the age of twenty-seven, he published his debut novel, A séta. In 1998, his debut short story collection, A kéklő pára, was published. Bartis is perhaps best known for his novel Tranquility, which was published in 2001. Tranquility was adapted into film, titled Nyugalom (2008). The film was directed by Róbert Alföldi and stars Dorottya Udvaros, Zalán Makranczi, Dorka Gryllus and Judit Hernádi. Tranquility was translated into English by Imre Goldstein in 2008. It was the first time his work had been translated into English. Goldstein's translation won the Best Translated Book Award (2009).

For one year, Bartis wrote short stories in the feuilleton of magazine Élet és Irodalom, publishing one story each month. In 2005, he published A Lázár apokrifek, a collection of the twelve short stories he wrote for the magazine.

In 2010, Bartis and poet István Kemény published a book, titled Amiről lehet, which features conversations from interviews they conducted of each other. In 2010, he published Tizenegy novella, an anthology consisting of eleven of Bartis' short stories, all of which were previously published in A kéklő pára and A Lázár apokrifek, with the exception of the story "Gyergyó éghajlata".

In 2019, Bartis published Az eltűnt idő nyoma, a collection of diary entries and "sticky notes".

In the early 2000s, Bartis spent time living abroad, with a DAAD scholarship in Berlin, Germany, and then Java, Indonesia for a while. His third novel, A vége, was published in 2015. It was partly written while he lived in Indonesia.

Bartis has received several awards, including the 1997 , the 2002  and the 2005 Attila József Prize. In 2006, he was awarded A Magyar Köztársasági Érdemrend lovagkeresztje. In 2017, he became a member of the Széchenyi Academy of Literature and Arts.

His books have been translated into English, Arabic, French, German, Chinese, Spanish, Portuguese, Turkish, Romanian, Polish, Czech, Croatian, Norwegian, Estonian, Serbian, Dutch, Italian, Slovak, Russian, Macedonian and Uyghur.

Photography
As a photographer, his photographs have been exhibited in numerous exhibitions. Bartis' first breakthrough in photography was in 1996, when his Az Engelhard-hagyaték photography exhibit was exhibited at the Műcsarnok-Dorottya Galéria in Budapest. The exhibit featured portraits of writers which were paired with portraits of women and each of the twenty-four writers wrote a poem or short story for their respective female portrait. The exhibition was later a success at Literaturhaus in Frankfurt, Germany in 1999. In 1998, his Photo Pygmalion exhibit was shown at Vintage Galéria in Budapest.

In 2010, Bartis published a photo-book titled A csöndet úgy, featuring 365 low-resolution photos taken with a mobile phone from January 2005 to December 2008. In 2016, he published a photo-book, titled A világ leírása, részlet, with text by István Kemény. The photos were exhibited at Deák Erika Galéria in Budapest in 2016. In 2018, he published a photo-book, titled A szigeteken, with text by Katharina Narbutovič, Zsolt Petrányi and Attila Szűcs. It was his largest photo-book to date, featuring photographs taken between 2014 and 2017, mostly in Java, around Yogyakarta in Indonesia. The photos were exhibited at Mai Manó Ház in Budapest in 2018.

Dramas
Bartis adapted Tranquility into a dramatic play, titled Anyám, Kleopátra, which premiered at the National Theatre in Budapest in 2003. The play was directed by Dezső Garas and starred Dorottya Udvaros. Bartis made his debut as a theater director in 2016 and directed his play Rendezés at the National Theatre in Târgu Mureș, Romania. The drama commemorated the victims of the Hungarian Revolution of 1956. It was also presented at the Comedy Theatre of Budapest in 2017.

Personal life
Bartis has lived in Budapest since 1984, and has partly lived in Yogyakarta (Java, Indonesia) since 2014.

He married in 1990. His daughter was born in 1990, and his son was born in 1993.

Bibliography

Novels

Short story collections

Plays
 Anyám, Kleopátra (2002)
 Romlás (2005)
 Rendezés (2013)

Non-fiction

Photo-books

Exhibitions
 Az Engelhard-hagyaték
 Műcsarnok-Dorottya Galéria, Budapest, 1996
 Literaturhaus, Frankfurt, 1999
 , Warsaw, 2006
 Photo Pygmalion
 Vintage Galéria, Budapest, 1998
 33 fotográfia
 Café Eckermann, Goethe Institut, Budapest, 2007
 A világ leírása, részlet
 Deák Erika Galéria, Budapest, 2016
 A szigeteken
 Mai Manó Ház, Budapest, 2018

Adaptations

Theatre

Film

Awards and honours
 1997: 
 2002: 
 2005: Attila József Prize
 2006: Knight's Cross of the Order of Merit of the Republic of Hungary
 2009: Award For Hungarian Art
 2009: Best Translated Book Award (for Tranquility)
 2010:  (for Romlás)
 2016:  (for A vége)
 2018: Magyarország Babérkoszorúja díjat

Scholarships
 1995: 
 1996: Hungarian Soros Foundation Literary Scholarship
 1997, 1999, 2003: National Cultural Fund Literary Scholarship
 1998, 1999, 2001: 
 2000: 
 2002: 
 2005: Szolnok Szigligeti Theatre Playwright Scholarship
 2006: Literary Colloquium Berlin Residency Scholarship
 2006: Hungarian Cultural Institute, Warsaw Artist Grant
 2007–2008: DAAD Artists-in-Berlin Program
 2010: Shanghai Writing Program
 2012: Tianjin Binhai New Area International Writing Program
 2013–2014: Landis+Gyr Literary Scholarship, Berlin
 2014: DAAD Re-invitation Grant

References

1968 births
Living people
People from Târgu Mureș
Writers from Budapest
Hungarian photographers
Attila József Prize recipients
20th-century Hungarian novelists
21st-century Hungarian novelists
20th-century short story writers
21st-century short story writers
Hungarian short story writers
21st-century Hungarian dramatists and playwrights
Hungarian male novelists
Hungarian male dramatists and playwrights
People who lost Romanian citizenship
Romanian people of Hungarian descent
Immigrants to Hungary